Keith Foote Nyborg (March 4, 1930 – September 15, 2019) was an American businessman who served as the United States Ambassador to Finland from 1981 to 1986.

He died on September 15, 2019, in Ashton, Idaho at age 89.

References

1930 births
2019 deaths
Ambassadors of the United States to Finland
Idaho Republicans